The  is an electric multiple unit (EMU) commuter train type built by J-TREC and used by the Japanese private railway operator Tokyu Corporation in the Tokyo area since March 2018.

Design
The 2020 series trains were built by Japan Transport Engineering Company (J-TREC) as part of its "Sustina S24 Series" family of 20-metre long four-door stainless steel cars. The styling of the trains was overseen by Tanseisha, a company involved in designing commercial buildings along the Tokyu route.

The classification "2020 series" for the trains was chosen to mark the year 2020 in which the Tokyo Olympics are to be held and in which Tokyu celebrates its 100th anniversary.

Variants
  2020 series: 10-car sets used on the Tokyu Den-en-toshi Line since March 2018
  3020 series: 6- and 8-car sets used on the Tokyu Meguro Line since January 2020
  6020 series: 7-car sets used on the Tokyu Oimachi Line since March 2018

2020 series

Details of the 2020 series were officially announced on 17 March 2017. Three ten-car sets (30 vehicles) are scheduled to be delivered during fiscal 2017, entering service in spring 2018, with further sets introduced over the following years. The first trainset, 2121, was delivered from the J-TREC factory in Yokohama in late November 2017, and shown off to the media on 30 November 2017. The second trainset, 2122, was delivered from the J-TREC factory in Niitsu, Niigata, in February 2018.

The first sets entered service on 28 March 2018.

Interior
Passenger accommodation consists of high-back longitudinal seats. In addition to passenger information screens placed above the doorways and car ends, LCD screens are also located above the seats. Security cameras are installed in the cars.

Formation
The trains are formed as follows, with five motored ("M") cars and five non-powered trailer ("T") cars, and car 1 at the  end.

Key 

 <: Current collection device (single-arm pantograph pointed towards Shibuya)
 >: Current collection device (single-arm pantograph pointed towards )
 VVVF: Variable-frequency drive
 SIV: Static inverter
 CP: Compressor

Build histories
The manufacturers and delivery dates for the fleet are as shown below.

3020 series

On 26 March 2019, Tokyu Corporation announced the introduction of new 3020 series trains on their Meguro Line. The first set of eight cars was delivered in April 2019. A second set of eight cars was transferred from J-TREC in Yokohama to Nagatsuta in May 2019. Trial runs on the Den-en-toshi Line began in June 2019.

The first 3020 series set entered revenue service on 22 November 2019.

Set 3123 was the first set to be lengthened to an eight-car formation, having re-entered service in April 2022. Another set 3121 was lengthened to an eight-car formation and re-entered service mid July 2022.  Finally on the 13 of August 2022, the remaining set 3122 was sent to Nagatsuta depot where it was lengthened to an eight-car formation.

Interior
Passenger accommodation consists of high-back seating. The trains are also fitted with security cameras and air purifiers.

Formation
The trains are operated as six-car sets. They were built as eight-car sets, but two cars per train will be stored until 2022, when platform doors are extended to fit 8-car trains as part of Tokyu Corporation's strategy to cope with high demand on the Meguro Line and for the opening of the Sōtetsu Tōkyū Link Line. All three trainsets are formed as follows:

Key
 < >: Current collection device (two single-arm pantographs)
 VVVF: Variable frequency drive
 SIV: Static inverter
 CP: Compressor
 BT: Battery

With the extension of platforms along the Meguro Line completed, Tokyu had begun the process of lengthening the entire fleet to eight car trainsets. As of August 2022, the entire 3020 series have been reformed from six cars and are distinguished with an “8-Cars” sticker located on the front window of the first and last cars. They are formed as follows:

Key
 < >: Current collection device (two single-arm pantographs)
 VVVF: Variable frequency drive
 SIV: Static inverter
 CP: Compressor
 BT: Battery
 T: Trailer Car

6020 series

Details of the 6020 series were officially announced on 12 October 2017. The first set was delivered from the J-TREC factory in Yokohama in December 2017, followed by a second in January 2018.

The first sets entered service on 28 March 2018.

In both sets, car 3 was replaced by a new-build "Q Seat" car built in October 2018. The outgoing cars were subsequently used in 2020 series sets 2126F and 2127F. The Q Seat cars are usually arranged in longitudinal mode, but on specific evening express trains from Ōimachi to Nagatsuta, they are arranged in transverse mode and can be used only with a reservation by paying a small surcharge.

Interior
Passenger accommodation consists of high-back longitudinal seating throughout, except car 3, which is a "Q Seat" car that features rotating pairs of seats that can be arranged in longitudinal mode or transverse mode. Security cameras are installed in the cars.

Build histories
The manufacturers and delivery dates for the fleet are as shown below.

Special liveries 
On 10 April 2022, 3020 series set 3121 received a special livery to commemorate the 100th anniversary of Tokyu Corporation's founding. A 2020 series set is also due to receive the commemorative livery from 17 April.

References
This article incorporates material from the corresponding article in the Japanese Wikipedia.

External links

 Official 2020 series news release 
 Official 3020 series news release 
 Official 6020 series news release 

Electric multiple units of Japan
2020
Train-related introductions in 2018
J-TREC multiple units
1500 V DC multiple units of Japan